Menigius is a genus of beetles in the family Carabidae, containing the following species:

 Menigius burgeoni Bänninger, 1932
 Menigius camerunensis Bänninger, 1929
 Menigius congoensis Bänninger, 1929
 Menigius hintzi Bänninger, 1929
 Menigius liberianus (H. W. Bates, 1889)
 Menigius phillipsi Bänninger, 1929
 Menigius rotundicollis (A. D. Murray, 1857)
 Menigius schaumi Chaudoir, 1880
 Menigius sulciger (Chaudoir, 1880)

References

Scaritinae